The Cairo–Dakar Highway or TAH 1 is Trans-African Highway 1 in the transcontinental road network being developed by the United Nations Economic Commission for Africa (UNECA), the African Development Bank (ADB), and the African Union. The major part of the highway between Tripoli and Nouakchott has been constructed under a project of the Arab Maghreb Union.

It is substantially complete except for a few kilometres on the Western Sahara-Mauritania border where there is currently only a desert track. The Nouadhibou-Nouakchott section was paved in 2005 (:fr:Transport en Mauritanie). It joins with the Dakar-Lagos Highway to form a north–south route between Rabat and Monrovia across the Sahara and around the western extremity of the continent.

Since 1994 the land border between Morocco and Algeria has been closed completely, so the Cairo–Dakar Highway cannot be used in its entirety. Construction in Tunisia continues.

See also

Maghreb highway
Trans-African Highway network
Trans–West African Coastal Highway

External links

1